Viva Las Vegas may refer to:

 Viva Las Vegas, 1964 film starring Elvis Presley and Ann-Margret
 "Viva Las Vegas" (song), song performed by Elvis Presley in the above-mentioned film
 Viva Las Vegas (EP), an EP by Elvis Presley, containing songs from the above-mentioned film
 "Viva Las Vegas", a fifth-season episode of the American television series CSI: Crime Scene Investigation
 "Viva Las Vegas", a second-season episode of the American television series Roswell
 Die Hard Trilogy 2: Viva Las Vegas, an American video game released in 2000
 Viva! Las Vegas, a Japanese video game of the late 1980s, also known as Vegas Dream

See also 

 Viva La Vega, DVD of Norwegian band Kaizers Orchestra